Thalassocystis is a genus of alga known from the Silurian of Michigan. It is possibly a red alga or a brown alga.

References

Silurian life
Paleontology in Michigan
Flora of Michigan
Algae genera
Fossil algae
Enigmatic algae taxa